StarStruck Kids is the junior season of StarStruck, is a 2004 Philippine television reality talent competition show, was broadcast on GMA Network. Hosted by Jolina Magdangal. The segment hosts are the StarStruck graduates with Mark Herras, Jennylyn Mercado, Rainier Castillo, Yasmien Kurdi, Nadine Samonte, Dion Ignacio, Christian Esteban, Katrina Halili, Tyron Perez, Sheena Halili, Jade Lopez, Anton dela Paz, Cristine Reyes and Alvin Aragon. They serve the junior hopefuls as they go through every phase of the competition, it premiered on March 20, 2004, replacing Search for a Star. The council was composed of Christopher de Leon, Janice de Belen and Aiza Seguerra. The season ended with 72 episodes on June 26, 2004, having Kurt Perez and Sam Bumatay as the junior Ultimate Survivors. It was replaced by Pinoy Pop Superstar in its timeslot.

Overview
The junior spin-off season of StarStruck was first announced by the hosts Dingdong Dantes and Nancy Castiglione after the season finale. This was an offshoot of the successful senior season, also announced on GMA Network program SOP, where the hosts invited kids from 5 to 7 years old to audition for the upcoming season. Most of the auditions were held at the GMA Network's headquarters and at SM Supermalls throughout the Philippines.

The pilot episode was aired on March 20, 2004. Like the senior version, the same rules were applied in selecting the Ultimate Survivors. This junior version of StarStruck is shown only on weekdays; Mondays to Thursdays would be tests and Fridays would be the elimination night. It became an emotional journey for the kids who had to leave the show. Nonetheless, they thoroughly enjoyed the workshops. The show held its the Final Judgment on June 26, 2004, at the Aliw Theater.

Selection process
In the spin-off year of the reality-talent search, out of hundreds who auditioned nationwide, only the top 100 were chosen for the first cut. From the top 100, it was trimmed down to the top 60, then to the top 30, and at last to the final 14 finalists.

The Final 14K underwent various workshops and training in order to develop their personalities, talents, and charisma. Every week, one or two hopefuls from the junior final 14 may have to say goodbye until only four remain. Those who were eliminated were dubbed as the juniors StarStruck Avengers.

The Final 4K will vie for the coveted the junior Ultimate Survivors titles, the juniors Ultimate Male Survivor and Ultimate Female Survivor, both of them would receive P1,000,000 pesos each plus an exclusive management contract from GMA Network.

The juniors Runners-up, both of them would receive P100,000 pesos each plus an exclusive management contract from the network. The juniors StarStruck Avengers (the losing contestants) also received an exclusive contract from the network.

Hopefuls

When the juniors Final 14K was chosen, they are assigned to different challenges every week that will show their acting, singing, and dancing abilities. Every Friday, one is meant to leave the competition until there were just six others who are left. From juniors’ survivor six, there will be two of them who will be eliminated and after the elimination of the two; the juniors final four will be revealed.

The juniors Final 4K will be battling with each other on the Final Judgment. People will choose who they want to win the competition by online voting and text voting. 30% of the result will come from the online and text votes and the remaining 70% is from the council.

Color key:

Weekly Artista Tests
Color key:

Week 1: The official Final 14K hopefuls have been chosen.

Challenge Winner Contestant: (Searching the Information)
Bottom Group Contestant: (Searching the Information)

Week 2: The Final 13K hopefuls.

Challenge Winner Contestant: (Searching the Information)
Bottom Group Contestant: (Searching the Information)

Week 3: The Final 12K hopefuls.

Challenge Winner Contestant: (Searching the Information)
Bottom Group Contestant: (Searching the Information)

Week 4: The Final 11K hopefuls.

Challenge Winner Contestant: (Searching the Information)
Bottom Group Contestant: (Searching the Information)

Week 5: The Final 10K hopefuls.

Challenge Winner Contestant: (Searching the Information)
Bottom Group Contestant: (Searching the Information)

Week 6: The Final 9K hopefuls.

Challenge Winner Contestant: (Searching the Information)
Bottom Group Contestant: (Searching the Information)

Week 7: The Final 8K hopefuls.

Challenge Winner Contestant: (Searching the Information)
Bottom Group Contestant: (Searching the Information)

Week 8: The Final 7K hopefuls.

Challenge Winner Contestant: (Searching the Information)
Bottom Group Contestant: (Searching the Information)

Week 9: The Final 6K hopefuls.

Challenge Winner Contestant: (Searching the Information)
Bottom Group Contestant: (Searching the Information)
Eliminated Contestant: None

Week 10: The Survivor 6K hopefuls, The official Final 4K hopefuls have been chosen.

Challenge Winner Contestant: (Searching the Information)
Bottom Group Contestant: (Searching the Information)

Week 11-12: The Final 4K Homecoming

Week 13: The Final Judgment, the junior Ultimate Survivors have been proclaimed.

Final Judgment
The winner was announced on a two-hour TV special dubbed as StarStruck Kids: The Final Judgment was held live on June 26, 2004, at the Aliw Theatre.

The show was hosted by Jolina Magdangal. The senior season are the segment co-hosted with Mark Herras, Jennylyn Mercado, Rainier Castillo, Yasmien Kurdi, Nadine Samonte, Dion Ignacio, Christian Esteban, Katrina Halili, Tyron Perez, Sheena Halili, Jade Lopez, Anton dela Paz, Cristine Reyes and Alvin Aragon. The council was formed with Christopher de Leon, Janice de Belen and Aiza Seguerra.

The opening dance number, together with this season's juniors avengers, were joined by this juniors final four and the senior season.

Announcement come, Sam Bumatay of Metro Manila was the junior Ultimate Female Survivor and Kurt Perez of Cabanatuan, Nueva Ecija was the junior Ultimate Male Survivor. The two were proclaimed as junior Ultimate Survivors and each of them received P1,000,000 pesos each plus and an exclusive management contract from GMA Network.

While, Ella Guevara of Quezon City and Miguel Tanfelix of Dasmariñas, Cavite were proclaimed as the juniors Runners-up, each of them received P100,000 pesos each plus and an exclusive management contract from the network. The juniors StarStruck Avengers (the losing contestants) also received an exclusive contract from the network.

The Final Judgment gained 35.2% in ratings. There were no plans yet for a second junior season probably because of too much psychological pressure on children during their talent tests.

TV Assignment
For their first TV Assignment, the junior final four Kurt Perez, Sam Bumatay, Miguel Tanfelix and Ella Guevara with the junior avengers Paul Salas and Shamel Leask were join the recurring cast of the telefantasya, Mulawin.

Signature dances
There are signature dances and songs made in each batch. 
With this batch, their signature dances and songs are:
Baby Superstar

Elimination chart
Color key:

Notes

 It was a non-elimination week. The following week the two contestants were eliminated.
 The first one to be eliminated was Bea Binene and the second was JM Reyes.
 In the final judgment night, Kurt Perez and Sam Bumatay were proclaimed as the junior Ultimate Survivors.

References

External links
 

2004 Philippine television seasons
2004 Philippine television series debuts
2004 Philippine television series endings
Filipino-language television shows
Philippine reality television series
StarStruck (Philippine TV series)